NLT may refer to:
 NLT (band), an American boy band
 National Literacy Trust, an independent charity based in London, England
 New Living Translation, a translation of the Bible into modern English
 Northolt Park railway station (station code: NLT), a Network Rail station in Northolt, Greater London
 Xinyuan Nalati Airport (IATA code: NLT), a seasonal airport in China
 New Looney Tunes, a television show airing on Boomerang

See also
 NLTS (oN-Line Text System)